Lillian Lightbourn is a Bermudian model and former beauty queen who was crowned Miss Bermuda World 2014 and represented her country at the Miss World 2014 pageant in London, England.

She is currently represented by Trump Model Management and has been featured in Harper's Bazaar, Glamour UK, Cosmopolitan UK, Nylon magazines, and many more.

She is a member of The Rock Church NYC.

References

Year of birth missing (living people)
Living people
Bermudian female models
Miss World 2014 delegates